A joint declaration was made on 11 February 2014 at the start of renewed negotiations to settle the Cyprus dispute. The following talks between Nicos Anastasiades, President of Cyprus, and Derviş Eroğlu, President of Northern Cyprus, were stalled in October 2014.

Background

Post-independence disputes between the Greek and Turkish communities in the Republic of Cyprus resulted, after the Turkish invasion of Cyprus in 1974, in the self-declaration of the Turkish Republic of Northern Cyprus. Attempts during the intervening forty years to resolve the division and re-unite Cyprus, most notably the Annan Plan between 2002 and 2004 had all failed, the Annan Plan doing so when, in parallel referendums in April 2004, the Turkish community had voted to accept but the Greek community had voted to reject it. Further negotiations took place after the Greek Cypriot presidential election of 2008 but these first ran into difficulty over disputes about the extent of the Republic of Cyprus's exclusive economic zone and oil exploration within it, and then collapsed over a legal case in a British court which supported Greek Cypriots' property rights within territory controlled by Northern Cyprus. Further meetings in 2010 and 2011 had no significant results and talks were suspended in 2012.

However, some things changed during 2012 and 2013. Gas was discovered in both Cypriot and neighbouring Israeli waters, but the simplest way of getting it to customers in Europe would be via a pipeline through Turkey. The banking collapse in 2013 in the Republic of Cyprus led to economic shrinkage and high unemployment, and reunification could be expected to speed economic recovery and growth. After a lapse of several years, America showed interest in working actively for a solution to the dispute. Nicos Anastasiades, elected President of the Republic of Cyprus in February 2013, had supported the Annan Plan.

The date proposed for renewing talks was October 2013. However, Anastasiades regarded agreement on a joint declaration as a precondition for talks, and agreement on the wording of the declaration was only achieved in February 2014.

The Joint Declaration
On 11 February 2014, the leaders of Greek and Turkish Cypriot communities, Nicos Anastasiades and Derviş Eroğlu, respectively, revealed the following joint declaration:

Reactions to the Joint Declaration
The governments of both Greece and Turkey expressed their support for renewed peace talks. The declaration was also welcomed by the European Union.

On 13 February 2014, Archbishop Chrysostomos lent Anastasiades his backing on the Joint Declaration.

On 14 February 2014, the Greek Cypriot negotiator Andreas Mavroyiannis and Turkish Cypriot negotiator Kudret Ozersay held their first meeting and agreed to visit Greece and Turkey respectively.

Reactions among the Greek Cypriot political parties were mixed. The opposition AKEL party declared its support for the declaration. However, Nicolas Papadopoulos, the leader of DIKO, the main partner to Anastasiades' party DISY in the governing coalition, opposed the declaration, and DIKO's executive committee voted on 21 February to recommend to the party's central committee that the party withdraw from the coalition from 4 March. On 27 February, DIKO decided to leave the coalition government, with the rationale that the Joint Declaration conceded separate sovereignty to Turkish Cypriots.

End of the talks 
In October 2014, the talks stalled as a result of a crisis ensuing from Turkey's sending of a warship to the Republic of Cyprus-controlled part of the Cypriot waters, as a part of a crisis over the exploration of offshore natural gas reserves. Anastasiades refused to attend the meeting on 9 October 2014, and talks did not resume until May 2015, after the election of Mustafa Akıncı as the Turkish Cypriot president in April 2015.

References

Cyprus peace process
Politics of Cyprus
Politics of Northern Cyprus
Secession in Cyprus
2014 in Cyprus
2010s in Cypriot politics
2014 in Northern Cyprus
Cyprus talks
Cyprus talks